Port Mòr can be
 Port Mòr, a location in Big Sand, Scotland
 Port Mòr, a location in Oban, Scotland
 Port Mòr, a location on Colonsay, Scotland
 Port Mòr, a location on Gigha, Scotland
 Port Mòr, a location on Great Bernera, Scotland
 Port Mòr, a location on Isle of Arran, Scotland
 Port Mòr, a location on Muck, Scotland
 Port Mòr, a location on Oronsay, Inner Hebrides
 Port Mòr, a location on Tiree, Scotland